CHRD may refer to:

Chordin, Chordin, the gene for a human protein involved in embryonic development
CHRD-FM, Canadian radio station
Chinese Human Rights Defenders, a human rights activist group